Sir James Gray, 2nd Baronet  ( – 14 February 1773) was a British diplomat and antiquary.

Life
He was the elder son of Sir James Gray, 1st Baronet and his wife Hester Dodd.  His younger brother was General George Gray.  
He completed his education at Clare College, Cambridge, being awarded M.A. in 1729. He then travelled on the continent.

He began a diplomatic career in 1744 as secretary to Robert Darcy, 4th Earl of Holderness, the Minister Resident at Venice and succeeded him as Resident there from 1746 to 1752.  In October 1753, he was sent to Naples, where he remained until 1763, undertaking a mission to Rome concerning The Young Pretender in 1755.  His final diplomatic position was as ambassador to Spain from 1766 to 1770, during which time he was there only about two years.  On his return to England in 1769, he was sworn to the Privy Council.  
He was made a Knight Companion of the Order of the Bath in 1759.

He and his brother were founder members of the Society of Dilettanti of which George was secretary and treasurer.  While in Naples, he took a close interest in the archaeological discoveries at Portici and Herculaneum.  
He nominated suitable young grand tourists for the Society of Dilettanti.  
He also offered advice on the king's new palace at Caserta.

He died in 1773 leaving two illegitimate 'natural' children: A son James born 1759 and a daughter Catherine born 1761 in Naples. Their mother was a noblewoman named Donna Caterina Rosiglio, to whom he was not married at the time of their births.  His baronetcy was inherited by his brother, who died the same year, upon which it became extinct.

References

Attribution

'Generations of Gray Revisited (2013) by Norma Curnow, Western Australia.

Sources
L. H. Cust, ‘Gray, Sir James, second baronet (c.1708–1773)’, rev. S. J. Skedd, Oxford Dictionary of National Biography, (Oxford University Press, 2004; online edn, Jan 2008), Retrieved 26 Aug 2008

1708 births
1773 deaths
Alumni of Clare College, Cambridge
Baronets in the Baronetage of Nova Scotia
British antiquarians
Knights Companion of the Order of the Bath
Members of the Privy Council of Great Britain
Ambassadors of Great Britain to Spain
Ambassadors to the Kingdom of Naples
Ambassadors of Great Britain to the Republic of Venice